Edgars Vardanjans (born 9 May 1993) is a Latvian former football player who retired due to injury.

International
He made his debut for Latvia national football team on 9 June 2017 in a World Cup qualifier against Portugal.

References

External links
 
 

1993 births
Footballers from Yerevan
Latvian people of Armenian descent
Living people
Latvian footballers
FS METTA/Latvijas Universitāte players
Latvian Higher League players
FK Spartaks Jūrmala players
Latvia youth international footballers
Latvia under-21 international footballers
Latvia international footballers
Association football midfielders